The Greek B Basket League, or Greek B Basketball League (Greek: Ελληνική Β Μπασκετ Λιγκ), is a national basketball league in Greece. It is also known as the Second National Championship, B National Championship, Second National League, B National League, Third Division, and in Greek, (Βήτα Εθνική καλαθοσφαίρισης) (Beta Ethniki Basketball). It is organized by the Hellenic Basketball Federation (E.O.K.).

It is the 3rd-tier level of the basketball league system in Greece, and was founded in its current form in 1986. Originally, the league began in 1961, as the Greek National B Class Championship, and it was the 2nd-tier level of Greek basketball until 1986, when it was replaced in that capacity by the Greek A2 Basket League.

The Greek B Basket League was originally held under a league format of two groups. From 1986 to 2012, the league was held under a one group league format. From 2013 to 2010, it was again held under a two group format. Under the current league format, a total of 58 clubs take part, which are separated into four groups that are based on geographical criteria.

Champions

Greek National B Class Championship (2nd-tier level)

First Two groups period (2nd-tier level)

Four Groups period (2nd-tier level)

One group period (3rd-tier level)

Two groups period (3rd-tier level)

References

External links
Greek Basketball Federation, Beta Ethniki 
Eurobasket.com Greek B Basket League

Greek B Basket League
3
Gre
Sports leagues established in 1961
Professional sports leagues in Greece